Langley Island may refer to:

Langley Island (Maryland), an island on the Potomac river
Langley Island (Massachusetts)

See also
Langlade Island, Saint Pierre and Miquelon